Khvajeh Khezr (also Romanized as Khvājeh Kheẕr) is a village in Dorunak Rural District, Zeydun District, Behbahan County, Khuzestan Province, Iran. At the 2006 census, its population was 172, in 42 families.

References 

Populated places in Behbahan County